Johann Peter Ritter (2 July 1763 - 1 August 1846) was a German composer, conductor, chorus master, and cellist  born and died in Mannheim, Karlsruhe, Baden-Württemberg, Germany).  He is best known in the United States for "Sun of My Soul" and "Holy God, We Praise Thy Name."

Peter Ritter was son of the oboist Georg Wilhelm Ritter and the nephew of the bassoonist Georg Wenzel Ritter. He was a student of Abbé Vogler, who also taught Giacomo Meyerbeer and Carl Maria von Weber. He played cello in the orchestra of the Mannheim National Theatre beginning in 1786 and became one of its concertmasters in 1801. From 1803 to 1823 he worked as its conductor. His successor was the Antonio Salieri student, Michael Frey.

In addition to more than 20 stage works, including Die lustige Weiber, one of the earliest known operas after William Shakespeare and one of ten operatic adaptations of The Merry Wives of Windsor. Ritter also composed church music and various instrumental works. His brother, Heinrich Ludwig Ritter, became known as a violinist, his, son Karl August Ritter, was a singer.

Works 
Der Eremit auf Formentera (Libretto: August von Kotzebue), komische Oper, 1788
Der Sklavenhändler (Libretto: Christian Friedrich Schwan), Singspiel, 1790
Die Weihe (Libretto: Georg Christian Römer), musikalisches Schauspiel, 1792
Die lustigen Weiber (Libretto: Georg Christian Römer after Shakespeare), Singspiel, 1794
Dilara oder Die schwarze Zauberinsel (Libretto: Wolfgang Heribert von Dalberg after Carlo Gozzi), Singspiel, 1798
Das Fest in Apollons Haine (Libretto: Georg Christian Römer), Festspiel zu Ehren des schwedischen Königspaares, 1803
Das neue Jahr (Neujahr) in Famagusta (after Clemens Brentano, Die lustigen Musikanten), Singspiel, 1804
Das Fest am Rheine (Libretto: Siegfried August Mahlmann), 1806
Salomon's Urtheil (Libretto: Georg Christian Römer), Oper, 1808
Das Fest im Olymp, musikalischer Prolog zum Namenstag der Großherzogin Stephanie von Baden, 1808
Der Zitherschläger (Libretto: Heinrich Seidel), Singspiel, 1810
Das Tal von Barzelonetta oder Die beiden Eremiten, Singspiel, 1811
Feodore (Libretto: August von Kotzebue), Singspiel, 1811
Alexander in Indien (Die Macedonier am Indus) (Libretto: Georg Christian Römer after Pietro Metastasio), Oper, 1811
Die Jubelfeier (Libretto: Karl Ludwig Kaibel), musikalisches Drama, 1816
Leonore oder Das Geistergericht (after Gottfried August Bürger), Ballade, 1815
Der Schutzgeist (Libretto: August von Kotzebue), dramatische Legende, 1816
Alfred (Libretto: August von Kotzebue), Oper, 1820
Der Mandarin oder Die gefoppten Chinesen (Libretto von Heinrich Ritter), komisches Singspiel, 1821
Hoang-Puff oder Das dreifache Horoskop (Libretto: Hermann Herzenskron), Singspiel, 1822
Bianca (Libretto: Albert Ludwig Grimm), Oper, 1825
Der Talisman, Singspiel, 1825
Das Grubenlicht (Libretto: Louise Beck), romantische Oper, 1833

External links 
 
 Peter Ritter im Bayerischen Musiker-Lexikon Online (BMLO)
 Liste der Bühnenwerke von Peter Ritter auf Basis der MGG bei Operone
 Musikalische Akademie des National-Orchesters Mannheim - Geschichte
 Oxford Grove Music Encyclopedia: Peter Ritter
Peter Ritter at American Directory of Historical Recordings https://adp.library.ucsb.edu/index.php/talent/detail/41312/Ritter_Peter_composer

Musicians from Mannheim
German composers
German classical cellists
German conductors (music)
1763 births
1846 deaths